Sprawy Narodu was a Polish monthly magazine, dealing with the socio-cultural topics published in the occupied Warsaw from July 1943 to July 1944. It was printed secretly by the National Party (Stronnictwo Narodowe). Eleven issues were published. The editor was Jan Dobraczyński.

References

External links
 WorldCat record

1943 establishments in Poland
1944 disestablishments in Poland
Defunct magazines published in Poland
Magazines established in 1943
Magazines disestablished in 1944
Magazines published in Warsaw
Monthly magazines published in Poland
News magazines published in Poland
Polish-language magazines
Polish underground press in World War II